Weber–Weaver Farm is a historic home and farm located at West Lampeter Township, Lancaster County, Pennsylvania. The property includes the Hans Weber House (1724), the Weber summer kitchen (c. 1800), the Weber barn (c. 1724), The John Weaver House and summer kitchen (c. 1765), the Weaver barn (c. 1904), the Weaver shed (c. 1904), and the Weaver garage (1930).  The Hans Weber House is a stone dwelling modeled on the Hans Herr House in its Germanic style.  It measure 36 feet by 34 feet, and was enlarged to a full two-stories and renovated between 1790 and 1810.  The John Weaver House was built as a two-story, Georgian style dwelling, subsequently enlarged and modified during the 19th and 20th centuries.

It was listed on the National Register of Historic Places in 1999.

References

Farms on the National Register of Historic Places in Pennsylvania
Georgian architecture in Pennsylvania
Houses completed in 1724
Houses in Lancaster County, Pennsylvania
National Register of Historic Places in Lancaster County, Pennsylvania
1724 establishments in Pennsylvania